Elvio Raúl Martínez (born May 1, 1982 in Rosario) is an Argentine former football midfielder.

External links
 Argentine Primera statistics  
 Statistics at BDFA 
 
 
 

1982 births
Living people
Footballers from Rosario, Santa Fe
Argentine footballers
Argentine expatriate footballers
FC Politehnica Timișoara players
Newell's Old Boys footballers
Nueva Chicago footballers
Talleres de Córdoba footballers
Aldosivi footballers
San Martín de Tucumán footballers
Tiro Federal footballers
Expatriate footballers in Romania
Argentine expatriate sportspeople in Romania
Argentine Primera División players
Liga I players
Association football midfielders